Luis Fernando "Nando" de Moura Cagnin (born April 28, 1984) is a Brazilian musician, music instructor and YouTuber who produces videos about heavy metal culture, video games, and politics.

Music and YouTube career
Moura became interested in music at the age of 7 studying the electric organ, later guitar, both influenced by the group Blind Guardian. He studied in the Netherlands at the Erasmus University Rotterdam. Moura founded his band named Pandora 101 alongside his brother Gugo in 1999, at the age of 17.  He played guitar and performed vocals, while his brother played the bass. They made four albums and a few singles.

Moura was inspired by groups including Whitesnake, Iron Maiden, Kiss, Pantera, and Death. Moura explained his band's lack of success by what he sees as Brazil's lack of appreciation for quality music.

In March 2016, Moura's Youtube channel had 500,000 subscribers and a total of 87 million views.

Created in 2012, his channel initially concentrated on his band as well as metal and pop culture. In late 2014 he shifted to a discussion of conservatism. As of 2016, Moura included references to Plato, Aristotle, Padre Paulo Ricardo, and others, using a rhetorical style that Moura describes as somewhat priestly, reflecting his education at an Adventist college. Moura benefited from YouTube's algorithm (at least before 2019) and directed users to novel content. In February 2019, YouTube demonetized many of Moura's videos, after which Moura released several videos complaining about this decision.

Nando Moura published online courses and a book called Masters of Capitalism.

Positions
As of 2016, Moura described himself as a conservative, saying that he emphasized preserving the good that society had produced and supporting freedom in individuals' actions. He opposed treating homosexual couples in the same manner as heterosexual ones, arguing that the former could not raise a child effectively and arguing with references to Plato and Aristotle.

Moura was a strong supporter of Jair Bolsonaro and campaigned for him in the 2018 presidential election. Later, he started to sharply criticize Bolsonaro's administration, calling him a "traitor" in a 2019 tweet criticizing the passage of an "anti-crime" package presented by Minister of Justice Sergio Moro.

Controversies
In early December 2020, Nando became involved in a controversy with the musician Matuê, claiming that Matuê's music was poor and sets a bad example through their use of drugs. Moura claimed that Matuê participated in the Flow Podcast program and that the program glorified marijuana use.

In mid-April 2019, a false story spread among networks and influencers, including Tecmundo and Felipe Neto, that Moura would be arrested for offending a college student. In 2015, Felipe Neto was convicted in the first instance for fake news about Nando Moura. The case was later dismissed.

In February 2019, Nando erroneously stated on his channel that Stalin had two Nobel Prizes. This led to mocking on social networks. The error was later corrected in the video description.

YouTube demonetized some videos on his YouTube channel for infractions related to hate speech and disinformation.

An opinion article in New York Times described his channel as "right-wing conspiracy-filled" and stated that it uses "pop culture as a gateway to far-right ideas".

Influence
Estadão describes Moura in 2019 as once being among the most influential online defenders of Jair Bolsonaro. In 2020, he became one of the main criticizers of Bolsonaro's government because of the government's attitudes about corruption and the COVID-19 crisis.

References

1984 births
Brazilian heavy metal musicians
Brazilian YouTubers
Living people